

Events
End of the Western Zhou Dynasty in China as Western barbarian tribes sack the capital Hao. The King Zhou you wang is killed. Crown Prince Ji Yi Jiu escapes to the East where he will reign as Zhou ping wang.

Births
Romulus and Remus

Deaths
Zhou you wang, King of the Zhou Dynasty of China.

References

770s BC